Seyyedan District is a district (bakhsh) in Marvdasht County, Fars Province, Iran. At the 2006 census, its population was 29,029, in 7,303 families.  The District has one city: Seyyedan. The District has two rural districts (dehestan): Khafrak-e Olya Rural District and Rahmat Rural District.

References 

Marvdasht County
Districts of Fars Province